Tek Taşımı Kendim Aldım is the 2006 album of Nil Karaibrahimgil, a female Turkish music singer-songwriter.

Track listing

All songs written by: Nil Karaibrahimgil (except "Bu mudur?" is co-written with Ozan Çolakoğlu)

External links 
 Tek Taşımı Kendim Aldım at Billboard.com
 

2006 albums
Nil Karaibrahimgil albums
Albums produced by Ozan Çolakoğlu